Jonathan Broom-Edwards  is a British para-sport athlete who competes mainly in category T44 high jump events. In 2013 he won his first major international medal with a silver medal at the IPC Athletic World Championship in the high jump.

Personal history
Broom-Edwards was born in Colchester in 1988. He was born with congenital talipes equinovarus (clubbed foot) in his left foot which leaves him with muscular dystrophy of his calf muscles as well as fusion and restricted range of motion of his left ankle. He also has problems with his right foot, a weak right knee and a muscular imbalance throughout his body. He matriculated to Loughborough University where he studied aeronautical engineering. Following university, Jonathan became a therapist and now specialises in soft tissue release, gait analysis and postural realignment. On the side, Jonathan is also a motivational speaker.

Sport career
Broom-Edwards was a keen basketball player as a youth and he played for Loughborough students while at university. A friend suggested that they should try out high jump to help them in their basketball leaps. He competed at county level and university meets in the high jump, with a personal best of 2.03m in 2009.  In 2010 he left the sport.

Although Broom-Edwards understood he had an impairment, he never considered himself as disabled, but after watching the London 2012 Summer Paralympics he realized that he could be eligible to be classified as a para-sport competitor. He was classified in 2013 as a T44 athlete and that year he qualified for the British team with a personal best of 2.06 at the Bedford International Games in May. His first major international competition was at the 2013 IPC Athletics World Championships in Lyon. There he competed in the T42/T44 high jump event where he took silver, losing to world record holder Maciej Lepiato of Poland. The next year Broom-Edwards and Lepiato met at the 2014 IPC Athletics European Championships in Swansea. Despite Broom-Edwards recording a personal best of 2.15, a world record height that would have won gold at the 2012 Paralympics, he was again pushed into second place as Lepiato recorded another new world record of 2.17. After returning from injuries, Jonathan posted another silver medal in the 2015 IPC Athletics World Championships in Dubai. At the 2016 IPC Athletics European Championships in Grosseto, Jonathan was pushed into a Bronze medal position in the mixed class competition due to a change in Razza points system. However, at the 2016 Paralympic Games in Rio de Janeiro, Jonathan achieved a seasons best of 2.10m to achieve Silver in his Paralympic debut.

Broom-Edwards was appointed Member of the Order of the British Empire (MBE) in the 2022 New Year Honours for services to athletics.

References

1988 births
Living people
Sportspeople from Reading, Berkshire
English male high jumpers
British disabled sportspeople
Track and field athletes with disabilities
Athletes (track and field) at the 2016 Summer Paralympics
Athletes (track and field) at the 2020 Summer Paralympics
Paralympic gold medalists for Great Britain
Paralympic silver medalists for Great Britain
Paralympic medalists in athletics (track and field)
Medalists at the 2016 Summer Paralympics
Medalists at the 2020 Summer Paralympics
Paralympic athletes of Great Britain
Members of the Order of the British Empire